Golets Sokhondo is a mountain in the Khentei Range, Khentei-Daur Highlands. Administratively it is part of the Transbaikal Krai, Russian Federation.

The Sokhondo Nature Reserve, a protected area surrounding the mountain, was named after this emblematic summit when it was established on 11 December 1973.

Geography
It is located in the southwestern part of the highland area, not far north from the border with Mongolia. 

See also
List of mountains in Russia

References

External links
История - Сохондинский государственный природный
Голец Сохондо - LiveJournal
ГОЛЕЦ СОХОНДО (Photographic exhibition)

Mountains of Zabaykalsky Krai
ceb:Gora Sokhondo